Geoffery Alan Weekes (14 June 1932 – 25 June 2015) was an Australian rugby league footballer who played in the 1950s and 1960s. He was a two-time premiership winner with the St George Dragons.

Career
A local Rockdale junior, Weekes went on to play eight seasons of first grade with the St George Dragons between 1954-1961 and was a prolific try scorer during those years. He won two premierships with Dragons, playing in both the 1958 Grand Final and the 1959 Grand Final.

After losing his regular first grade spot to the young and talented  Reg Gasnier, Weekes joined a number of players that followed Ken Kearney to the Parramatta club and he played two final seasons with them in 1962–1963.

Death
Weekes died on 25 June 2015 at Greenwich Hospital, Sydney aged 83.

References

1932 births
2015 deaths
Australian rugby league players
Parramatta Eels players
Rugby league centres
Rugby league players from Sydney
St. George Dragons players